Marko Albrecht (born 23 June 1970), known by his stage name Mark 'Oh, is a German disc jockey and electronic music producer.

Biography
Starting out with a rock band titled "Line Up", Albrecht decided to turn to the ever-growing rave scene under the name "Mark'Oh".

Entering the scene as a DJ initially, Albrecht moved on to producing music - scoring chart success across Europe in 1993 with "Randy (Never Stop That Feeling)". The following year, hit single "Love Song" was to follow before scoring his first number one single in his native Germany and in Sweden with "Tears Don't Lie" (which samples the 1974 German hit "Tränen lügen nicht" by Michael Holm, which itself is a cover of the Italian hit "Soleado", released the same year).

Though this was his sole number one hit in Europe, nearly two decades on, Albrecht is still releasing singles and producing albums. He still achieves some level of success in his native country of Germany.

Discography

Albums

Singles

2012 "DJ Waiting For"

2018 "Someone To Love"

2018 "That Feeling" (feat. Corinna Jane)

2020 "Jean-Claude Van Damme"

.***Denotes: Released As Single Only***

References

1970 births
Living people
People from Dorsten
German DJs
Echo (music award) winners
Electronic dance music DJs
ZYX Music artists